The Wild West is compilation presented by Vallejo, California rapper, Celly Cel.  The album was released in 2006 for Real Talk Ent. and was the third of four projects released by Celly Cel in 2006.  This compilation features some of West Coast Rap's biggest names.  Guests on the album include The Game, MC Eiht, Daz Dillinger, Bad Azz, E-40, Suga Free, Keak Da Sneak and Too Short.

Track listing
"The Wild Wild West" – 4:02  
"That'z Gangsta" MC Eiht – 4:03  
"Just to Get Cha" Keak Da Sneak – 3:50  
"Get Racks" The Game & Sean T – 3:52  
"Give It Up" Too Short – 3:42  
"Millions 2 Trillions" Bad Azz – 3:44  
"Pop My Whip" Dat Nigga Daz & H-Hustler – 3:47  
"The Way U Luv Me" Suga Free – 3:49  
"Neva Change" Hillside Stranglaz – 3:19  
"No Problems" E-40 & Kaveo – 3:15  
"Do It Big" Money Grip  & Lil' Percy – 3:50  
"V. I. P." D.C. – 4:06

Celly Cel albums
2006 compilation albums
Real Talk Entertainment compilation albums
Albums produced by Big Hollis
Gangsta rap compilation albums